David Pierre is a Seychellois politician and teacher.  He was a member of the Seychelles National Party until 2011. He then founded the Popular Democratic Movement.

Pierre is a teacher by profession.  He was a member of the National Assembly of Seychelles from 2002 to 2016, serving as the parliamentary Leader of the Opposition from 2011 to 2016.  He was a candidate for the 2015 presidential election.

In 2016, Pierre was appointed as ambassador to Ethiopia and Permanent Representative of Seychelles to the African Union.  He resigned in 2020.

References

1967 births
Living people
Members of the National Assembly (Seychelles)
Seychelles National Party politicians

Ambassadors of Seychelles